Scuba Dice were an Irish pop punk and punk rock band who gained national attention after participating in the 2007 series of the singing contest You're A Star.

History

Formation (2003–2007)
The band formed in 2003 and gained a following in Ireland for their live shows and original material. After entering the 2006 Hype Entertainment Battle of the Bands and winning, the band released a self-titled EP, then opened for The Frank and Walters at a gig at the Olympia Theatre, featuring Des Foley of Mr Lightweight as an additional guitarist. In early 2007 Scuba Dice made their television debut as contestants in the national TV show You're a Star, with Brendan O'Connor defining their sound as "power pop, punk, punk pop". The band competed for the coveted prize of a record contract and as part of the show they covered Green Day's "Holiday", which was released as a single and reached No. 8 and on the Irish Singles Chart, later becoming the 42nd best selling single of 2008 for an Irish artist. They also released their second single "Made", an original song, as a physical release. The band also entered the Beatbox competition house to write a song with the contestants.

Two founding members leave (2007–2010)
It was around this time that Eoin 'Spud' Murphy left the band due to interpersonal conflict within the band and was replaced by the band's roadie and guitar tech Liam Bryne. Shortly after this the band announced that Sean Savage (the band's original drummer) was no longer a member on their Bebo and MySpace pages, which resulted in angry exchanges through each other's blogs. This temporarily left the band drummer-less before they recruited Pat Byrne, a member of Mr Lightweight, to play the drums for them on their fourth demo, and the single "Let Go". After this the band recruited drummer Daire Nolan. The band planned to release "Just Dance", a song from their third demo, as a single through iTunes; while the date had been set, the single was not released.

In August 2008 the band took part in LA or Busk, a competition open to unsigned Irish bands. The competition, ran by Blastspace, consisted of 8 heats, each heat consisting of ten of Ireland's best young bands. Scuba Dice went on to finish third in the final. A new single, titled "Let Go", was released on 13 February 2009 as a digital download available through DownloadMusic.ie. The band organized their first headlining Irish tour in February 2009 to promote "Let Go" with "Under Stars & Gutters".

In the summer of 2009 Scuba Dice embarked on a short tour of Ireland with All or Nothing for three dates of their  tour and another three dates with Jody Has A Hitlist and Snakes Hate Fire. Scuba Dice also played on the main stage of the Dithmarscher Rock Festival 2009 in Germany. Later in 2009, Scuba Dice embarked on their first tour of America, where they played four showcase shows and earned positive reviews.

2010–2011: The Lost Art of Romance
In the summer of 2010, between 25 June and 3 July, the band embarked on a headline tour around Ireland taking in places such as Wexford, Galway City, Cork City, Limerick City, Mayo, Louth and Antrim. The band also supported My Passion, Canterbury, One Night Only and Francesqa around Ireland. They also performed three headline Halloween shows around Ireland in Cork City, Limerick City, and Dublin. Scuba Dice then supported Paramore at The O2 in Dublin on 6 November 2010. They played a 30-minute set and were very well received. Scuba Dice then took time off to prepare for their Summer 2011 tour which included six dates in Ireland as well as dates in Austria, Sweden and Germany. They then began working on their first studio album, and released the EP The Lost Art of Romance in April 2011.

Lead singer Joe Grace later moved in Australia and the band's website was shut down, with their Facebook also becoming inactive after early 2012. No official news of the band's dissolution or a hiatus was released.

Members
Members
Joe Grace – lead vocals, rhythm guitar (2003–present)
Padraig King – lead guitar, backing vocals (2003–present)
Liam Byrne – bass, backing vocals (2007–present)
Shane Pearson – drums, percussion (2010–present)

Former members
Eoin Murphy – bass (2003–2007)
Sean Savage – drums (2003–2008)
Daire Nolan – drums (2008–2010)

Discography

Extended plays

Demos

Singles

References

External links
Official Site

Irish pop punk groups
You're a Star contestants